Herself the Elf was a franchise line for young girls similar to Strawberry Shortcake. It was created by American Greetings (through its "Those Characters From Cleveland" research-and-development unit). It included a series of dolls from Mattel, an animated special, books, records.

Characters
Each of the "Herself the Elf" characters had an exploratory poem:
Herself the Elf (main character of the franchise)
"...is the elf in charge. When it comes to work, there's no job too large. She keeps nature running as smooth as can be; helps raise a fawn to a deer, a sapling to a tree. She's charming and fair and funny too. With her magical powers, there's nothing she can't do. Her wand has a bell with a beautiful ring. She got it from her father, the old elf king."

Snowdrop
"...is pure as newly driven snow. When it comes to helping, she never says no. She spins snowflakes in blows breezes with such perfect care, it's no wonder she's in charge of water and air. She carries a wand with a caterpillar on the top. When it comes to good deeds, she never does stop."

Meadow Morn
"...is Herself's* best pal. She's feisty, she's quick, an adventurous gal. When it comes to creatures large and small, Meadow Morn* takes care of them all. She carries a wand with a bluebird at the end. She's Herself* and the animals' very best friend."

Willow Song
"...has extra keen ears, so she can listen to what no one else hears. She's in charge of all of nature's sounds, from the chirping of birds to the barking of hounds. She's often thought of as a daydreaming dear. But she's not as clumsy as she may appear. Her frog-tipped wand keeps villains away, making the woods safe, by night and day."

Wood Pink
"...is the elf designer. When it comes to good taste there's no one finer. She's in charge of all the colors of nature...the trees, sky, leaves, and every living creature. With just a flick from her butterfly-tipped wand she can camouflage an elephant, turn a brunette into a blonde."

The Magic of Herself the Elf

Attempted revival
In October 2016, American Greetings revealed to bring back Herself the Elf as an animated series. It was stated to be a co-production between Cloudco Entertainment and French animation studio Gaumont Animation. There has been no new information since then and it appears to be scrapped.

References

Doll brands
Fictional elves